Alan N. Maisel (born July 25, 1946) is an American politician who served in the New York City Council for the 46th district from 2014 to 2021. He is a Democrat. He formerly represented the 59th district of the New York State Assembly from 2006 to 2013.

The district includes Bergen Beach, Canarsie, East Flatbush, Flatlands, Floyd Bennett Field, Gerritsen Beach, Marine Park, Mill Basin, Plumb Beach and Sheepshead Bay in Brooklyn.

Life and career
Maisel is a lifelong resident of Brooklyn and graduated from the Brooklyn Center of Long Island University with a B.A. in History and an M.A. in Urban Studies. He also holds an Advanced Certificate of Administration and Supervision in Education from Brooklyn College.

Prior to his election to the Assembly, Maisel served as a member of Community Board #18. Prior to that he served as an Administrative Assistant to Congressman Charles Schumer and Chief of Staff to Assemblyman Frank R. Seddio, who preceded him in office. He also served as the Assistant Director of the New York State Legislative Task Force on Reapportionment from 1972 to 1982. He is also a retired school principal and public school teacher.

Maisel and his wife Lynn have two children, Terry and Lauren.

New York City Council
In 2013, Maisel opted to seek a seat on the New York City Council to succeed Lewis A. Fidler. He easily won the Democratic nomination, and went on to win the general election as well. He took his seat on January 1, 2014.

References

External links
The New York City Council: Councilman Alan N. Maisel

1945 births
Living people
Democratic Party members of the New York State Assembly
Jewish American state legislators in New York (state)
Long Island University alumni
New York City Council members
21st-century American politicians
Brooklyn College alumni
21st-century American Jews